The modern organetto is a small diatonic button accordion used in Italian folk music. It is often used to play the saltarello.

References

Accordion
Italian musical instruments
Keyboard instruments
Free reed aerophones